John Taylor (11 January 1939 – October 2016) was an English professional footballer who played as a centre forward.

Career
Born in Cresswell, Taylor played for Chesterfield, Mansfield Town, Peterborough United and Ilkeston Town.

References

1939 births
2016 deaths
English footballers
Chesterfield F.C. players
Mansfield Town F.C. players
Peterborough United F.C. players
Ilkeston Town F.C. (1945) players
English Football League players
Association football forwards